Pili annulati (also known as "ringed hair") is a genetic trait in which the hair seems 'banded' by alternating segments of light and dark color when seen in reflected light.

See also
 Pili pseudoannulati
 List of cutaneous conditions

References

External links
Hair Transplant

Conditions of the skin appendages
Human hair
Hair diseases